Shafiqullah is a male Muslim given name. It may refer to

Shafiqullah (cricketer) (born 1989), Afghanistan cricketer
Shafiqullah Mohammadi, Afghan provincial governor under the Taliban

Arabic masculine given names